The P. K. Vasudevan Nair Ministry (29 October 1978 – 7 October 1979) was a short-lived ministry of the Kerala Legislative Assembly led by Communist Party of India Leader P. K. Vasudevan Nair.

P. K. Vasudevan Nair took charge as the Chief Minister of Kerala 29 October  1978. However, he tendered his resignation on 7 October 1979.

Ministers

See also
P. K. Vasudevan Nair
Communist Party of India

References

Kerala ministries
Communist Party of India state ministries
1978 establishments in Kerala
1979 disestablishments in India
Cabinets established in 1978
Cabinets disestablished in 1979